Lenur Serverovych Temirov (born January 1, 1990, in Olmaliq, Uzbek SSR) is a Crimean Tatar amateur Greco-Roman wrestler who competes in the men's lightweight category for Ukraine.

Career
He was the 2018 World Championship bronze medalist. He was also a bronze medalist at the 2010 Junior World Championships.  Temirov is a member of the wrestling team for Dynamo Simferopol in his current residence Simferopol, and is coached and trained by Ismet Saliev.

Temirov represented his adopted nation Ukraine at the 2012 Summer Olympics in London, where he competed for the men's 60 kg class. However, he lost the qualifying round match to Kazakhstan's Almat Kebispayev, who was able to score eight points in two straight periods, leaving Temirov without a single point.

After the Annexation of Crimea by the Russian Federation Temirov took part in Russian national competitions and was even called to the Russian national team. During that period of his career, he ranked 5th in the Russian National Championships in 2017 and won the All-Russian Wrestling Tournament for Prizes of the Crimean Head Sergei Aksyonov in 2015.

References

External links
Profile – International Wrestling Database
NBC Olympics Profile

1990 births
Living people
Ukrainian people of Crimean Tatar descent
Ukrainian male sport wrestlers
Olympic wrestlers of Ukraine
Wrestlers at the 2012 Summer Olympics
People from Olmaliq
Crimean Tatar sportspeople
World Wrestling Championships medalists
European Wrestling Championships medalists
Wrestlers at the 2020 Summer Olympics